The French Island Marine National Park is a protected marine national park in Western Port, Victoria, Australia. The  marine park extends  along the north shore of French Island and protects a range of habitats including seagrass beds, mangroves and intertidal mud flats.

See also

 Protected areas of Victoria
 List of national parks of Australia
 Parks Victoria

References

Ramsar sites in Australia
Marine parks in Victoria (Australia)
Phillip Island
Western Port